Events in the year 2003 in the Islamic Republic of Iran.

Incumbents
 Supreme Leader: Ali Khamenei
 President: Mohammad Khatami
 Vice President: Mohammad-Reza Aref
 Chief Justice: Mahmoud Hashemi Shahroudi

Events

 October 21 - Iran agrees to suspend processing and enriching uranium and allow unannounced inspections by the IAEA.
 November 12 - The IAEA finds no evidence of a nuclear program but expresses concern about plutonium production.
 December 26 – The 6.6  Bam earthquake shook southeastern Iran with a maximum Mercalli intensity of IX (Violent), leaving more than 26,000 dead and 30,000 injured.

Notable births
 Yasha Asley

Notable deaths

 July 8 – Ladan and Laleh Bijani, Iranian conjoined twins
 September 6 – Mohammad Oraz, Iranian mountain climber, Mount Everest Summiter, died while climbing Gasherbrum I.
 July 11 – Zahra Kazemi, Iranian-Canadian freelance photographer murdered by the Prosecutor Saeed Mortazavi. (b. 1949)

 
Years of the 21st century in Iran
2000s in Iran
Iran
Iran